Hedley Austin (born 19 December 1960) is a South African cricketer. He played in two first-class matches for Eastern Province in 1983/84 and 1984/85.

See also
 List of Eastern Province representative cricketers

References

External links
 

1960 births
Living people
South African cricketers
Eastern Province cricketers
Sportspeople from Gweru